Dmitry Nikolayevich Ushakov (January 24, 1873 – April 17, 1942) was a Russian philologist and lexicographer.

He was the creator and chief editor (1935–1940) of the 4-volume Explanatory Dictionary of the Russian Language with over 90,000 entries. He was also the creator of an orthographic dictionary of the Russian  language (1934).

He influenced his student, Grigoriy Vinokur, who dedicated his book The Russian Language: A Brief History to him.

Ushakov died in Tashkent, where he was evacuated during World War II. His work on a definitive explanatory dictionary of the Russian language was continued by Sergei Ozhegov.

References

External links
Searchable version of Dal's, Ushakov's and Ozhegov's dictionary

1873 births
1942 deaths
Writers from Moscow
People from Moskovsky Uyezd
Russian philologists
Russian lexicographers
Moscow State University alumni
Corresponding Members of the USSR Academy of Sciences